Ziff may refer to:

People 
 Arnold Ziff (1927–2004), British businessman and philanthropist
 Daniel M. Ziff (1973-), American investor and billionaire
 Dirk Edward Ziff (1965-), American investor and billionaire
 Morris Ziff (1914?-2005), physician, educator and researcher specialising in arthritic and rheumatic disorders
 Paul Ziff (1920-2003), American artist and philosopher
 Robert D. Ziff (1967- ), American investor and billionaire
 William Bernard Ziff, Sr. (1898–1953), American publishing executive
 William Bernard Ziff, Jr. (1930–2006), American publishing executive

Things
 Artie Ziff, a recurring character in The Simpsons
 "The Ziff Who Came to Dinner", an episode of The Simpsons revolving around Artie Ziff
 Och-Ziff Capital Management, global hedge fund and alternative asset management firm
 Ziff (Book of Mormon), unknown substance mentioned in the Book of Mormon
 Ziff Davis, American publisher and Internet company
 Zanzibar International Film Festival

See also
 ZIF